Eight Arms to Hold You is the second studio album by alternative rock band Veruca Salt. It was released on February 11, 1997, through Outpost/Geffen Records.

Release
The album was produced by Bob Rock. The title is a reference to the working title for The Beatles' film eventually titled Help!.

Eight Arms to Hold You peaked at number 55 on the Billboard 200. The single "Volcano Girls", written by Nina Gordon, was a rock radio hit. Veruca Salt performed "Shutterbug", written by Louise Post, on Saturday Night Live. Besides those two, there were three other singles released from the album: "Benjamin", "The Morning Sad", and "Straight".

This was the last album to feature all of the original band members - Gordon, Post, Steve Lack, and Jim Shapiro - until the 2015 album Ghost Notes.

Track listing

Personnel
Veruca Salt
Nina Gordon - guitar, vocals
Louise Post - guitar, vocals
Jim Shapiro - guitar, drums, backing vocals
Steve Lack - bass guitar, guitar

Additional personnel
Jim McGillveray - percussion
Zach Ingraham - whiteboard
Bob Rock - producer
Randy Staub - engineer, mixing
Brian Dobbs - engineer
Mike Cusick - assistant engineer
Jim Labinski - assistant engineer
Jeff Lane - assistant engineer, mixing assistant
Darren Grahn - assistant engineer
George Marino - mastering
Mike Gilles - digital editing, assistant engineer, digital programming

Charts

Album

Singles
1997 – "Volcano Girls" – US Modern Rock Tracks - No. 8
1997 – "Volcano Girls" – US Mainstream Rock Tracks - No. 9
1997 – "Volcano Girls" – UK Singles Chart - No. 56
1997 – "Volcano Girls" – Australian ARIA singles chart - No. 47
1997 – "Volcano Girls" – Swedish singles chart - No. 32
1997 – "Shutterbug" – US Mainstream Rock Tracks - No. 39
1997 – "Shutterbug" – Australian ARIA singles chart - No. 114
1997 – "Benjamin" – UK Singles Chart - No. 75
1997 – "Straight" – US Mainstream Rock Tracks - No. 38

References

1997 albums
Albums produced by Bob Rock
Albums recorded at A&M Studios
Albums recorded at The Warehouse Studio
Veruca Salt albums